Charles Boyle (1838–1919) was a Canadian Horse Racing Hall of Fame owner and trainer of Thoroughbred racehorses who was a four-time winner of the Queen's Plate, the oldest continuously run race in North America. He was also known for his influence as a breeder, particularly after he imported the stallion Havoc, who sired four Plate winners, into Canada. Boyle was inducted into the Canadian Horse Racing Hall of Fame in 2001.

He was the father of trainer David A. Boyle and of the World War I soldier, adventurer and businessman Joseph W. Boyle, known as Klondike Joe Boyle.

In 1871, Boyle and his family have moved to Woodstock, Ontario, a residence he would maintain for the rest of his life. Charles and wife Martha are buried in the Woodstock Presbyterian Cemetery along with their son Joseph, who died in 1923.  Joseph was originally buried in England but his remains were brought back to Woodstock in 1983 to be interred with his parents.

References

External links

1838 births
1919 deaths
Canadian Horse Racing Hall of Fame inductees
Canadian horse trainers
Canadian racehorse owners and breeders
People from Woodstock, Ontario
Sportspeople from Hamilton, Ontario